The Plainsman is a local newspaper in the Mitchell's Plain region of Cape Town, Western Cape, South Africa. 

Weekly newspapers published in South Africa
Mass media in Cape Town
Publications with year of establishment missing